Roos Vanotterdijk (born 7 January 2005) is a Belgian competitive swimmer. She is the Belgian record holder in the long course 50 metre freestyle, 100 metre freestyle, 50 metre backstroke, 100 metre backstroke, and 100 metre butterfly, as well as the short course 50 metre backstroke and 100 metre individual medley. She is a six-time medalist in individual events at the European Junior Swimming Championships and medalist at the European Youth Olympic Festival.

Career

2019–2021
At the 2019 European Youth Summer Olympic Festival, held in Baku, Azerbaijan, Vanotterdijk won the fifth medal for Belgium at the Festival in any sport, achieving a time of 59.33 seconds in the final of the 100 metre butterfly to win the silver medal in the event. In April 2021, at the 2020 European Aquatics Championships held at Danube Arena in Budapest, Hungary, she placed 49th in the 100 metre butterfly and 34th in the 50 metre butterfly. Two months later, at the 2021 European Junior Swimming Championships held at Stadio Olimpico del Nuoto in July in Rome, Italy, she won the bronze medal in the 50 metre butterfly with a time of 26.55 seconds, finishing 0.41 seconds behind gold medalist Daria Klepikova of Russia.

2022

2022 European Junior Championships

Vanotterdijk won five medals at the 2022 European Junior Swimming Championships, held in Otopeni, Romania in July, including one gold medal, two silver medals, and two bronze medals. Her first medal was a bronze medal in the 50 metre backstroke, where she finished third with a time of 28.62 seconds after setting a new Belgian record in the semifinals with a time of 28.50 seconds. In the 100 metre butterfly, she won the gold medal and European junior title with a Belgian record time of 57.85 seconds, swimming 0.06 seconds faster than the previous mark of 57.91 seconds set by Kimberly Buys. She next won the bronze medal in the 100 metre freestyle with a personal best time of 55.34 seconds to finish within seven-tenths of a second of gold medalist Nikolett Pádár of Hungary. For the 100 metre backstroke, she won the silver medal with a Belgian record time of 1:00.90, finishing just 0.02 seconds behind the gold medalist Dóra Molnár of Hungary. Later in the same finals session as the 100 metre backstroke, she won a second silver medal, this time in the 50 metre butterfly with a time of 26.63 seconds, finishing 0.13 seconds ahead of bronze medalist Jana Pavalić of Croatia.

2022 European Aquatics Championships
The first day of competition, she ranked nineteenth in the 100 metre freestyle with a time of 55.95 seconds and achieved first-alternate status for the semifinals. For the semifinals, her alternate status was called upon, after Nikolett Pádár of Hungary withdrew from the event, and she placed thirteenth with a time of 55.68 seconds. The following day, she finished in a time of 26.76 seconds in the preliminaries of the 50 metre butterfly and qualified for the semifinals ranking sixteenth. She placed fourteenth in the semifinals with a time of 26.85 seconds. The third day, she placed 28th in the 50 metre backstroke with a time of 29.27 seconds.

The fourth day, Vanotterdijk swam a 59.06 in the prelims heats of the 100 metre butterfly, qualifying for the semifinals ranking eleventh. She brought her time down to a 58.42 in the semifinals, ranked sixth across both semifinal heats, and qualified for the final. The following morning, she qualified for the semifinals of the 100 metre backstroke with a 1:01.39 and overall rank of thirteenth in the preliminaries. Later in the day, in the final of the 100 metre butterfly, she placed eighth with a time of 58.74 seconds. Approximately 20 minutes later, she was one of three swimmers born after 2004 to compete in the semifinals of the 100 metre backstroke, where she placed fourteenth with a time of 1:01.61.

2022 Swimming World Cup
Leading up to the 2022 FINA Swimming World Cup, Vanotterdijk set a Belgian record in the short course 50 metre backstroke on 15 October with a time of 27.27 seconds at the International Swim Festival in Aachen, Germany. At the 2022 Swimming World Cup stop in Berlin, Germany, with competition beginning 21 October, Vanotterdijk ranked third in the morning preliminaries of the 100 metre individual medley with a Belgian record and personal best time of 59.54 seconds and qualified for the evening final. Earlier in the morning, she dropped 1.03 seconds from her personal best time in the 50 metre freestyle to tie Maaike de Waard of the Netherlands for nineteenth place with a time of 24.89 seconds. In the evening final of the 100 metre individual medley, she lowered her Belgian record to a 59.34 and placed seventh, finishing 0.77 seconds behind bronze medalist Anastasia Gorbenko of Israel. The second day of competition, she placed twelfth in the 100 metre backstroke with a personal best time of 58.56 seconds. On the third and final morning, she ranked seventh in the preliminary heats of the 100 metre butterfly, qualifying for the evening final with a personal best time of 58.03 seconds. Competing in the evening final as the only junior swimmer, born after 2004, she swam a personal best time of 57.90 seconds and placed sixth.

Following the World Cup, in December at the long course 2022 Rotterdam Qualification meet in Rotterdam, Netherlands, Vanotterdijk achieved a personal best time and Belgian record in the 50 metre backstroke with a 28.32. She also achieved a personal best in the 100 metre freestyle with a time of 55.19 seconds.

2023
At the 2023 Flemish Open Swimming Championships, conducted in long course metres and held in February in Antwerp, Vanotterdijk set six new Belgian records in individual events over a period of two days. On 10 February, she set a 54.72 in the preliminaries of the 100 metre freestyle and a 54.51 in the final of the 100 metre freestyle. On 11 February, she set a 1:00.08 in the preliminaries of the 100 metre backstroke, a 25.29 in the preliminaries of the 50 metre freestyle, a 59.62 in the final of the 100 metre backstroke (becoming the first Belgian woman faster than 1:00:00 in the event), and a 25.17 in the final of the 50 metre freestyle. On 12 February, she brought her total number of Belgian records in individual events for the competition to nine, setting new national marks of 28.06 seconds in the preliminaries of the 50 metre backstroke, 57.82 seconds in the preliminaries of the 100 metre butterfly, and 27.97 seconds in the final of the 50 metre backstroke.

International championships (50 m)

Personal best times

Long course metres (50 m pool)

Short course metres (25 m pool)

National records

Long course metres (50 m pool)

Legend: sf – semifinal; h – preliminary heat

Short course metres (25 m pool)

Legend: h – preliminary heat

References

External links
 

2005 births
Living people
Belgian female butterfly swimmers
Belgian female backstroke swimmers
Belgian female freestyle swimmers
People from Houthalen-Helchteren
21st-century Belgian women